Shahrakan is a village situated in the western side of the Kingdom of Bahrain, south of the village of Malkiya. The village lies in the Northern Governorate administrative region. It has a population of approximately 3,000 people. 

The village was a site of unrest during the Bahrain uprising.

References

Populated places in the Northern Governorate, Bahrain